Wayne Stead (born 13 April 1973) is a New Zealand cricketer. He played in one List A match for Canterbury in 1997/98.

See also
 List of Canterbury representative cricketers

References

External links
 

1973 births
Living people
New Zealand cricketers
Canterbury cricketers
Cricketers from Christchurch